Brett Milton Wetterich (born August 9, 1973) is an American professional golfer.

Wetterich was born in Cincinnati, Ohio. He attended Oak Hills High School and Wallace State Community College. He turned professional in 1994.

Wetterich was a PGA Tour rookie in 2000, but injury truncated his season and he spent the next few seasons playing mainly on the Nationwide Tour, where he had wins in 2003 and 2004. He returned to the PGA Tour in 2005 and in 2006 he won the EDS Byron Nelson Championship. This win helped him secure a place on the 2006 U.S. Ryder Cup team by finishing tenth on the points list. He became the first (and as of 2018, the only) player to go from Q-School to making the Ryder Cup team in the following year. He also finished tenth on the 2006 year-end PGA Tour money list with earnings of $3,023,185.

Wetterich led the 2007 Masters Tournament at the mid-way point, but collapsed on Saturday, shooting an 83, the highest score posted by any weekend leader in the storied tournament's history. He finished the tournament T37.

Shoulder injuries cut Wetterich's 2008 season short, kept him off the course in 2009, and cost him significant Tour status in 2010 after he failed to satisfy his medical exemption. He finished 156th on the money list and was demoted to the Past Champions category, among the lowest priority rankings on Tour. He won his third event on the Nationwide Tour in 2011, but finished 29th on the money list, four places short of a PGA Tour card. Wetterich has not played a full PGA Tour season since 2010.

Wetterich has been featured in the top 25 of the Official World Golf Ranking, reaching a career high of 21st in 2007.

Professional wins (4)

PGA Tour wins (1)

Nationwide Tour wins (3)

Results in major championships

CUT = missed the half-way cut
"T" = tied

Results in The Players Championship

CUT = missed the halfway cut
"T" indicates a tie for a place

Results in World Golf Championships

QF, R16, R32, R64 = Round in which player lost in match play
"T" = Tied

U.S. national team appearances
Ryder Cup: 2006

See also
1999 PGA Tour Qualifying School graduates
2001 PGA Tour Qualifying School graduates
2004 Nationwide Tour graduates
2005 PGA Tour Qualifying School graduates

References

External links

American male golfers
PGA Tour golfers
Ryder Cup competitors for the United States
Korn Ferry Tour graduates
Golfers from Ohio
Sportspeople from Cincinnati
1973 births
Living people